Epiona is a genus of achilid planthoppers in the family Achilidae. There is at least one described species in Epiona, E. kirejtshuki.

References

Further reading

 
 
 
 
 

Achilidae
Auchenorrhyncha genera